Niklas Tasky (born 11 February 1991) is a German footballer who plays as a centre-back for Regionalliga Nord club TSV Havelse.

Career
Tasky made his professional debut for TSV Havelse in the 3. Liga on 24 July 2021 against 1. FC Saarbrücken.

References

External links
 
 
 
 

1991 births
Living people
People from Hanover
Footballers from Lower Saxony
German footballers
Association football defenders
TSV Havelse players
1. FC Kaiserslautern II players
VfR Mannheim players
FC Nöttingen players
SpVgg Neckarelz players
Lynn Fighting Knights men's soccer players
3. Liga players
Regionalliga players